Gnaphalium polycaulon, the many stem cudweed, is a plant species in the family Asteraceae. It is widespread across much of Mesoamerica, South America, and the West Indies, and naturalized in parts of Asia and Africa.

Stems, leaves and phyllaries are covered with a dense coat of woolly hairs, giving the plant a whitish appearance. Flower heads are born in tight, elongated array. Each head contains numerous florets, mostly yellowish but sometimes with purple tips

References

polycaulon
Flora of North America
Flora of South America
Plants described in 1788